Saint-Médard-de-Guizières is a commune in the Gironde department, region of Nouvelle-Aquitaine, southwestern France. It has been twinned with the village of Wedmore, England since 1975. Saint-Médard-de-Guizières station has rail connections to Bordeaux, Périgueux, Brive-la-Gaillarde and Limoges.

Population

See also
 Communes of the Gironde department

References

Communes of Gironde